Min Chi-rok (1799 – 17 September 1858), formally honoured as Internal Prince Yeoseong. He also known as Duke Hyojeong or Duke Sungan, was a Korean political figure of the Joseon Dynasty. He was the father of Empress Myeongseong and the maternal grandfather of King Sunjong of Korea. After he died, his son-in-law, King Gojong of Korea, promoted him to Uijeongbu and Yeonguijeong.

Early life 
Min Chi-rok was born into the aristocratic Yeoheung Min clan in 1799 as the only son of Min Gi-hyeon, and his third wife, Lady Jeong of the Yeonil Jeong clan. Min was a great-great-grandson of Min Jin-hu; Queen Inhyeon’s eldest brother. He was also the 16th great-grandson of Min Yu (민유, 閔愉) who was the granduncle of Queen Wongyeong. 

Min studied under scholar Oh Hui-sang (오희상) when he was young, and eventually married his daughter, Lady Oh of the Haeju Oh clan, as his first wife. But she later died at the age of 36 in 1833 with no offspring. After mourning for 3 years, he married Yi Gyu-nyeon's daughter, Lady Yi of the Hansan Yi clan in 1836. They eventually had a son and two daughters, but they all died prematurely. His wife then gave birth to a third daughter, Min Ja-yeong, on 17 November 1851 who would become the future Queen Consort to King Gojong. He died with an illness while he was in Sado City, Honshu, Japan on 17 September 1858.

Legacy 
After his death, his wife and daughter went to live with his relatives in the House of Gamgodang, the house that King Sukjong built for Queen Inhyeon’s father in 1687, until his daughter became Queen.  

In 1861, a relative of his clan, Min Seung-ho, became his adoptive son to continue his family line. When Min Jayeong became Queen Consort in 1866, he was granted the royal title of “Min Chi-rok, Internal Prince Yeoseong”, and appointed as Yeonguijeong after his death. His wife was also posthumously honored as Internal Princess Consort Hanchang (한창부부인). His first wife was also granted the royal title of “Internal Princess Consort Haeryeong of the Haeju Oh clan” (해령부부인 해주 오씨, 海寧府夫人 海州 吳氏) as she was also considered the mother of Queen Min.

Aftermath
On 30 November 1874, his wife and their adoptive son, Min Seung-ho, died from a bombing assassination.

Prior to his wife’s death, his daughter had started to involve herself in politics. She informally became known as Queen Min. Her political involvement eventually brought the Yeoheung Min clan more influence in politics and life threats from the Queen’s father-in-law, Heungseon Daewongun, who sought to get rid of her.  

Queen Min was assassinated in her husband’s private living quarters on 8 October 1895. Her death brought rage from various western powers, as Queen Min brought their influence into Joseon Dynasty politics.

Family
 Great-Great-Great-Great-Great-Great-Great-Grandfather
 Min Hyo-son (Hangul: 민효손, Hanja: 閔孝孫)
 Great-Great-Great-Great-Great-Great-Great-Grandmother
 Lady Yun of the Papyeong Yun clan (본관: 파평 윤씨); daughter of Yun Ji-kang (윤지강)
 Great-Great-Great-Great-Great-Great-Grandfather
 Min Yeo-jun (민여준, 閔汝俊) (1539 - 1599)
 Great-Great-Great-Great-Great-Great-Grandmother
 Lady Yi of the Jeonju Yi clan (전주 이씨, 全州 李氏); descendant of Grand Prince Hyoryeong
 Great-Great-Great-Great-Great-Grandfather
 Min Gi (Hangul: 민기, Hanja: 閔箕) (1568–18 January 1641)
 Great-Great-Great-Great-Great-Grandmother
 Lady Hong of the Namyang Hong clan(남양 홍씨, 南陽 洪氏); daughter of Hong Ik-hyeon (홍익현, 洪翼賢)
 Great-Great-Great-Great-Grandfather
 Min Gwang-hun (Hangul: 민광훈, Hanja: 閔光勳) (1595–1659), scholar during the reign of King Injong.
 Great-Great-Great-Great-Grandmother
 Lady Yi of the Yeonan Yi clan (본관: 연안 이씨); daughter of Yi Gwang-jeong (이광정, 李光庭)
 Great-Great-Great-Grandfather
 Min Yu-jung (민유중, 閔維重) (1630–1687).
 Great-Great-Great-Grandmother
 Internal Princess Consort Eunseong of the Eunjin Song clan (은성부부인 은진 송씨,  恩城府夫人  恩津 宋氏) (1637 - 1672); Min Yu-jung's second wife, daughter of Song Jun-gil (송준길, 宋俊吉), Yeonguijeong during the reign of King Hyojong.
 Great-Great-Grandfather
 Min Jin-hu (민진후, 閔鎭厚) (1659 – 1720), eldest brother of Queen Inhyeon (second consort of King Sukjong).
 Great-Great-Grandmother
 Lady Yi of the Yeonan Yi clan (본관: 연안 이씨); Min Jin-hu’s second wife, daughter of Yi Deok-ro (이덕로, 李德老)
 Great-Grandfather
 Min Ik-su (민익수, 閔翼洙) (1690 – 1742).
 Grandfather
 Min Baek-bun (민백분, 閔百奮) (1723 – ?)
 Grandmother 
 Lady Sim (심씨, 沈氏); daughter of Sim Jung-hyeon (심중현, 沈重賢)
Father
 Min Gi-hyeon (민기현, 閔耆顯) (1751 – 1 August 1811); was appointed to Kaeseong Ministry
 Mother
 Stepmother - Lady Jo the Haman Jo clan (함안 조씨, 咸安 趙氏) (1748 - 4 April 1764); daughter of Jo Jung-cheom (조중첨)
 Stepmother - Lady Yi of the Seongju Yi clan (성주 이씨, 星州 李氏) (1763 - 15 March 1792)
 Biological mother - Lady Jeong of the Yeonil Jeong clan (본관: 연일 정씨, 延日 鄭氏) (1773 - 9 March 1838); Min Gi-hyeon’s third wife
Wives and their respective issue(s):
Internal Princess Consort Haeryeong of the Haeju Oh clan (해령부부인 해주 오씨, 海寧府夫人 海州 吳氏) (1798 - 15 March 1833)
Internal Princess Consort Hanchang of the Hansan Yi clan (한창부부인 한산 이씨, 韓昌府夫人 李氏) (1818 - 30 November 1874)
 Unnamed son
 Unnamed daughter
 Unnamed daughter
 Adoptive son - Min Seung-ho (민승호, 閔升鎬) (1830 - 30 November 1874); son of Min Chi-gu (1795-1874)
 Adoptive daughter-in-law - Lady Kim of the Gwangsan Kim clan (본관: 광산 김씨, 光山 金氏) (? - ? 23 April); Min Seung-ho's first wife
 Unnamed adoptive grandson (? - 1874)
 Adoptive grandson - Min Yeong-ik (민영익, 閔泳翊) (1860-1914); eldest son of Min Tae-ho (1834-1884)
 Adoptive daughter-in-law - Lady Kim of the Yeonan Kim clan (본관: 연안 김씨, 延安 金氏) (? - ? 11 February); Min Seung-ho’s second wife
 Adoptive daughter-in-law - Lady Yi of the Deoksu Yi clan (본관: 덕수 이씨, 德水 李氏) (? - ? 1 July); Min Seung-ho’s third wife
 Daughter - Min Ja-yeong, Empress Myeongseong of the Yeoheung Min clan (17 November 1851 - 8 October 1895) (민자영, 閔玆暎) (명성황후 민씨)
 Son-in-law - Yi Myeong-bok, Emperor Gojong of Korea (8 September 1852 - 21 January 1919) (이명복 대한제국 고종황제)
 Unnamed grandson (4 November 1871 - 8 November 1871)
 Unnamed granddaughter (13 February 1873 - 28 September 1873)
 Grandson - Yi Cheok, Emperor Sunjong of Korea (25 March 1874 - 24 April 1926) (이척 대한제국 순종황제)
 Granddaughter-in-law - Empress Sunmyeong of the Yeoheung Min clan (20 November 1872 - 5 November 1904) (순명효황후 민씨)
 Granddaughter-in-law - Yun Jeung-sun, Empress Sunjeong of the Papyeong Yun clan (19 September 1894 - 3 February 1966) (윤증순, 尹曾順) (순정황후 윤씨)
 Unnamed grandson (5 April 1875 - 18 April 1875)
 Unnamed grandson (18 February 1878 - 5 June 1878)

In popular culture
Portrayed by Lee Do-ryeon in 2001-2002 KBS2 TV series Empress Myeongseong

References 

1799 births
1858 deaths
Joseon scholar-officials